Hsu Li-kong (born December 27, 1943) is a Taiwanese film producer. He is known for co-producing the successful wuxia film Crouching Tiger, Hidden Dragon (2000), which earned him an Academy Award nomination for Best Picture, a BAFTA Award for Best Film Not in the English Language, and an Independent Spirit Award for Best Film. He also won the Golden Horse Award for his work on the film Vive L'Amour (1994).

Filmography

External links

Taiwanese film producers
Film directors from Henan
1943 births
Living people
Filmmakers who won the Best Foreign Language Film BAFTA Award